= Flower of Light =

Flower of Love
- Directed by: Ali Noori Oskouie
- Produced by: Eshraghanimation Co
- Production company: Eshraghanimation
- Release date: 2011
- Running time: 90 mins.
- Country: Iran

Flower of Light is a feature film by Ali Noori Oskouie. Flower of light won the award in 29th Fajr International Film Festival.

== Plot ==
Flower of Light tells the story of little people living in an unknown land. They water their farms with water foundation near their village. Behind the mountain which those people live there, the wizards live that want to affect little people's mind with injecting some medical drugs into water foundation. To be protected from the effects of drugs, little people decide not to use the water, this issue spawns some problems for those people.
